Mob Enforcer is a 2004 Mafia-related PC game developed by Touchdown Entertainment, then the maintainers of the LithTech engine for Monolith Productions. It was released on the Xbox one year later with multiplayer capabilities under the title Chicago Enforcer.

Reception
GameZone had a mixed review for the PC version, finding it entertaining for the effective gameplay, non-linear approach and authentic 1920s recreation, but criticized the lack of creativity and unforgiving enemies, stating that "the game gets repetitive and frustrating." The Xbox port, however, had a much more negative reception. GameSpot gave the game a 2.3 out of 10, finding it a repetitive and ugly game, with broken gameplay that featured "AI either overpowered or underpowered" and "underwhelming weapons". IGN gave a 4.1, with the review reading that "Any fun that could be squeezed out of this poorly designed title is negated by long loading times and unbalanced game mechanics." TeamXbox was more forgiving with a 5.1, feeling that "some situations created by the AI are interesting and do a nice job of reflecting the style of gunplay that would have taken place during the 1930s".

References

External links
Mob Enforcer at MobyGames

2004 video games
2005 video games
Windows games
Kemco games
LithTech games
Organized crime video games
Video games set in Chicago
Video games set in the 1930s
First-person shooters
Multiplayer and single-player video games
Video games developed in the United States
Xbox games